The Bat-Signal is a distress signal device appearing in American comic books published by DC Comics, as a means to summon the superhero, Batman. It is a specially modified searchlight with a stylized emblem of a bat affixed to the light, allowing it to project a large bat symbol onto cloudy night skies over Gotham City.

The signal is used by the Gotham City Police Department as a method of contacting and summoning Batman in the event his help is needed, but also as a weapon of psychological intimidation to the numerous criminals of Gotham City.

It doubles as the primary logo for the Batman series of comic books, TV shows and films.

To celebrate Batman's 80th anniversary, DC Comics and Warner Bros. lit the Bat-Signal in thirteen cities on September 21, 2019, starting in Melbourne and ending in Los Angeles.

Origins

The Bat-Signal first appeared in Detective Comics #60 (February 1942). The signal has several different origins in comics featuring post-Crisis continuity. It is introduced as a new tool after the Batman's first encounter with the Joker in the 2005 series Batman: The Man Who Laughs, and also during the 1990 "Prey" storyline in Legends of the Dark Knight.

In the 2006 series Batman and the Mad Monk, Commissioner James Gordon initially uses a pager to contact Batman, but during a meeting with the superhero Gordon throws it away, saying he prefers a more public means of contacting him. After Batman departs, Gordon looks out at the city and considers the exceptional view from his current position, hinting at the future creation of the Signal. 

In the 1989 Batman film, Batman gives the signal to the Gotham police force, enabling them to call him when the city was in danger. In 2005's Batman Begins, then-lieutenant James Gordon installs the Bat signal on the roof of the police department himself. The film suggests Gordon was inspired to create the signal after Batman left mobster Carmine Falcone chained across a spotlight after a confrontation at the docks, Falcone's silhouette on the spotlight vaguely resembling a bat.

On the 1992 television show Batman: The Animated Series, the signal is introduced in the episode "The Cape and Cowl Conspiracy", though a makeshift signal was used earlier in "Joker's Favor".  On 2004's The Batman, Gordon invents it to summon Batman in "Night in the City", although the signal is also alluded to in an earlier episode.

Additional appearances
 
  In Detective Comics #466 (1976), the villainous Signalman traps Batman inside the Bat-Signal device. 
 In issue #6 of the 1989 series Legends of the Dark Knight, a group of crime bosses projects the signal upside down in order to summon Batman to help them fight a killer they cannot defeat. 
 Catwoman uses the Bat-Signal in the 1996 special The Long Halloween.
 In the 1999 miniseries Batman: Dark Victory, after Batman asks for The Riddler to offer his insight into the riddles of new villain the Hangman, the Riddler uses the Signal to summon Batman after he's finished his analysis. Later in the series, the Hangman sneaks onto the roof of Police Headquarters and turns the Bat-Signal on to lure then-recently appointed Commissioner Gordon to the roof and try to kill him, but is thwarted when Two-Face cuts Gordon down.
 During the 1993 Knightfall storyline, one of Bane's henchmen remarks that the Bat-Signal is a "stupid set-up", as it allows criminals to know where Batman is, or at least where he will be, and lets them keep track of his movements.
 In the 1996 Halloween special comic series, Batman: Haunted Knight, Scarecrow alters the Bat-Signal to notify Batman that he has kidnapped Gordon. By adding an orange bulb and painting "eyes" on the signal, he turns the beam into a stylized Jack-o'-lantern image, with the bat symbol forming the mouth beneath two eyes.
 In the beginning of the 1999 No Man's Land story arc in Batman, a junior officer creates an improvised Bat-Signal out of spare parts. Gordon smashes it to pieces as he is angry at Batman as he believes that the vigilante abandoned Gotham. Oracle also builds a small Bat-Signal to summon Batman.
 In the 2002 comic book series Gotham Central, it is explained that Batman's existence is not officially recognized by the Gotham City authorities, and the police claim to Gotham citizens that the Bat-Signal is merely a method of using the Batman "urban legend" to intimidate Gotham's criminal underworld. Owing to the events in the "War Crimes" storyline, relations between Batman and the Gotham City Police Department under Commissioner Michael Akins are officially severed, and as a result, the Bat-Signal is removed from the roof of Gotham Central. Needing Batman's help later, Akins retrieves a spare Bat-Signal for a single use. This signal is a more sophisticated laser which paints a green bat symbol in the clouds and is more visible. This version of the signal is donated by Kord Industries (see the Blue Beetle). The laser signal is said to have been unused because the city council deems it an "inappropriate gift" (The characters are notably unimpressed by the more high tech version).
 In the 2006 series 52, The Question alters the traditional Bat-Signal to project a spray-painted question mark. In the One Year Later series, however, with the re-installation of Gordon as commissioner, relations with Batman improve. Upon Batman's return from one year of self-imposed exile, the Bat-Signal is activated once again.
 In the "Lovers and Madmen" story arc from the 2006 series Batman Confidential, Batman sees the Bat-Signal and assumes Gordon is calling him to ask for his help. When he reaches the rooftop, however, he finds the Joker instead.
 In the 2009 crossover event Blackest Night: Batman, Batman and Robin deal with resurrected zombies of their dead foes, some of which have attacked the GCPD Headquarters. When Black Lanterns attack the headquarters, the Bat-Signal shines in the sky, cracked and covered with two corpses surrounding the bat symbol. This prompts the Dynamic Duo to head over and help.
 In the 2014 series Batman Eternal, the Bat-Signal is shattered by new Commissioner Jack Forbes as part of his campaign against Batman, Forbes acting as a patsy for Carmine Falcone as he seeks to undermine Batman's status in the city as part of a new plan by an unknown foe. At the conclusion of the storyline, Cluemaster— the true villain of the piece— ties Batman to the Bat-Signal before unmasking him and carving the bat symbol onto his chest, but Bruce manages to escape his bonds, the storyline concluding with a new signal on the roof of the GCPD as Gordon is released and Batman's reputation is redeemed. 
 During the Joker's 2015 attack on Gotham, Batman notes that his enemies have a pact that they will shine the Bat-Signal upside-down on the day he dies, with the Dark Knight using that plan to rally his other enemies to help him stop Joker's latest rampage, reasoning that none of them want the kind of destruction the Joker intends to unleash.
 After Batman's apparent death fighting the Joker, the Powers Corporation, as part of a campaign to create a new Batman, create the 'Bat-Blimp', which includes a high-tech electromagnetic Bat-Signal projected down from the airborne blimp, often used to carry the new Batman into action. After Gordon is nearly killed by new villain Mister Bloom, the true Batman returns in a confrontation right next to the original, reactivated Bat-Signal, even hitting one of Bloom's minions with the metal bat in the Signal when it is shattered by an attack.
 In the Elseworlds Batman & Dracula trilogy novel Batman: Crimson Mist, Gordon and Alfred use the Signal to summon the vampire Batman after he has killed Penguin's gang, wanting to establish the situation now that Batman has surrendered to his vampire instincts. Later, Two-Face and Killer Croc use the signal to draw Gordon and Alfred to the roof so that the two sides can discuss a possible alliance against the vampire Batman and his new assault on Gotham's criminals.

In other media

1949 Columbia serial
The Bat-Signal made its first on-screen appearance in the Batman and Robin serial by Columbia. In its first incarnation, it was simply a high powered projector that was actually kept in Commissioner Gordon's office. When needed, he would simply wheel the Bat-Signal over to his office window and shine it directly to the sky. Though small, it was powerful enough to cast an image of the Bat symbol against the clouds.

1960s TV series
The Bat-Signal seldom appeared in the 1960s TV series, Commissioner Gordon generally contacting Batman using a dedicated phone line (the Batphone).  However, the Bat-Signal was occasionally used (for instance, in the episode "The Sandman Cometh" when Bruce Wayne and Dick Grayson are away on a camping trip), whenever Batman needed to be summoned from the field.  Its first appearance was in the pilot episode, "Hi Diddle Riddle". The animated background for the closing credits of the TV series depicted the Bat-signal in the night sky over Gotham City.

Gotham
In a promotion website for the 2014 Gotham TV series on Fox.com called "Gotham Chronicle", which is an online newspaper following recent events from Gotham, one of them stated that a Floodlight was built on top of the G.C.P.D building, referencing that the future Bat-Signal was used by police before it was a calling card for Batman, also stating that the series introduced the early uses of the Bat-Signal.

At the conclusion of the third-season finale, "Heroes Rise: Heavydirtysoul", Bruce Wayne is seen standing on a ledge overlooking the city as a searchlight gradually rises and picks out an area of dark cloud that, when illuminated, looks like a bat.

In the finale of the fourth season, "A Dark Knight: No Man's Land", James Gordon has Lucius Fox activate the Floodlight on top of the G.C.P.D building. At the conclusion of the episode, Gordon tells Bruce Wayne that the signal is meant to be a symbol of hope, while both are looking up at the clouds illuminated by the Floodlight.

During No Man's Land in the fifth season, Gordon continues using the signal as a symbol of hope for the good people left in Gotham and later meets with Bruce at the Floodlight in "Year Zero". In the series finale "The Beginning...", Commissioner Gordon and Harvey Bullock re-ignite the searchlight in order to celebrate Bruce Wayne's return to Gotham after ten years. Alfred Pennyworth then arrives and informs them that Bruce is otherwise engaged and can not attend their meeting. However, having noticed the searchlight that illuminates the sky, the Dark Knight then appears on a building from across the street, watching Gordon, Bullock and Alfred.

Arrowverse
In the CW series The Flash, a 'Flash signal' is created by Cisco, who claimed to have gotten the idea from "some comic book", which implies Batman does not exist in on Arrowverse Earth One. However, Earth 38, the universe Supergirl takes place in makes several references to him, solely as "Clark's (kind of) friend", and Oliver later makes reference to Bruce Wayne on Earth One.

In the second part of the Elseworlds crossover, the Bat-Signal is shown, though it seems to have been inactive for sometime during Batman's disappearance.

In the pilot episode of Batwoman, Gotham City Mayor Michael Akins was planning to turn off the Bat-Signal forever due to Batman's disappearance. The Bat-Signal was later destroyed by Alice in the episode "Down Down Down". A new Bat-Signal was made in "Who Are You?" by Luke Fox.

Titans
The Bat-Signal appears in the season finale of Titans, titled "Dick Grayson", in a dream world created by Trigon.

Live-action film

Burton/Schumacher series
In Tim Burton's 1989 film Batman, Batman gives the signal to the police as a gift so that they can summon him when he is needed, after he defeats The Joker.

In Burton's 1992 sequel Batman Returns, Batman has mirrors stationed atop Wayne Manor that reflect the Bat-Signal through his window, alerting him to its presence in the night sky. The signal is used when Commissioner Gordon needs Batman's help when the Red Triangle Circus Gang attack Max Shreck during Christmas and appears again at the end of the film as a surviving Catwoman looks on.

In Joel Schumacher's 1995 sequel Batman Forever, the criminal psychologist Dr. Chase Meridian uses the Bat-Signal to call Batman, in order to seduce him. Batman is slightly peeved at this: "The Bat-Signal is not a beeper". Later, the Riddler alters the Bat-Signal by projecting a question mark into the sky with the Bat-symbol forming the dot at the base. (The Riddler in the comics uses a similar tactic in Batman: Dark Victory; after brokering a tentative alliance with Batman, the Riddler changes the signal, projecting a question mark into the sky in order to let Batman know that he has an answer for him). A music video for "Kiss from a Rose", also from Batman Forever, features singer Seal performing the song while standing near the Bat-Signal.

In Schumacher's 1997 film Batman & Robin, Poison Ivy alters the Bat-Signal by changing it to a "Robin-Signal" to lure Robin into a trap.

Nolan series
In Christopher Nolan's 2005 film Batman Begins, then-lieutenant James Gordon finds the mobster Carmine Falcone strapped on to a searchlight in the docks of Gotham City, for the Gotham Police force to arrest him, left by Batman. Lieutenant Gordon then notices that Falcone's shadow is projected into the clouds of the night sky, similar to the silhouette of a bat. At the end of the film, the Bat-signal appears, as a searchlight that projects the shape of a bat, installed atop police headquarters as a means to contact Batman.

In the 2008 sequel The Dark Knight, as in Frank Miller's Batman: The Dark Knight Returns, Gordon uses the Bat-Signal to remind Gotham of Batman's presence. The signal proves to be very effective, with drug dealers and criminals becoming apprehensive at its very appearance. At the end of the film, after reluctantly agreeing to let Batman take the blame for the murders committed by Harvey Dent in order to preserve Dent's image as Gotham's hero, Gordon hesitantly destroys the signal using an axe in front of various members of the police force and the press.

In the 2012 film The Dark Knight Rises, the rusted remains of the destroyed Bat-Signal are still atop police headquarters. However, at the end of the film, with Batman declared dead, Gordon sees a restored Bat-Signal, providing hope that Batman has survived. (The signal itself is never used once in the film, however, making it the only live-action film about Batman where this occurs.)

The Batman (2022)
In the 2022 film The Batman, directed by Matt Reeves who co-wrote the screenplay with Peter Craig, the Bat-Signal is featured prominently.  Robert Pattinson, in his opening narration as Bruce Wayne/Batman, states that the signal is a recent development for the city, and serves as a means for Jim Gordon to call the Batman when needed.  But its main purpose is to create fear for Gotham's criminal element, by reminding them (to great effect) that while the Batman may not be hiding in every shadow, he could be there, waiting to strike.  Or, as Batman says, this does not translate into a fear that he is lurking in every shadow, rather that he is the shadows.  As a result, the lone, opportunistic, and petty criminals second guess their actions and run away when the Bat-Signal appears.

DC Extended Universe

During 2014's SDCC, a teaser for Zack Snyder's Batman v Superman: Dawn of Justice was shown to the audience in Hall H. The teaser showed Batman in his armored Batsuit atop a building one rainy night in Gotham. Batman removes a sheet to reveal the Bat-Signal and proceeds to turn it on. From there audience are shown the projected image of the Batman logo in the sky until a figure appears out of nowhere in its place. A close up on the figure reveals it is Superman glaring down at Batman readying his heat vision, as Batman stares back at the Man of Steel.

In the actual film, the Bat-Signal is first referenced when Superman lands in front of the Batmobile, causing it to crash into an empty warehouse, Superman tearing the car open to inform Batman not to respond the next time they shine his light in the sky. Later, believing Superman responsible for a bombing of Congress, Batman activates the Bat-Signal himself to draw Superman to Gotham to confront him, unaware that Lex Luthor is manipulating them both into combat so that Superman will either be killed by Batman's kryptonite spear or forever compromise his image by killing Batman to save his mother. During the battle, the Bat-Signal is destroyed when Superman throws Batman into it.

The Bat-Signal appears again in Justice League, with Gordon using it to call Batman along with Wonder Woman, The Flash, and Cyborg. It also appears again at the end.

Animation

DC Animated Universe

In 1992's Batman: The Animated Series, the signal was built by Commissioner Gordon in "The Cape and Cowl Conspiracy".  Barbara Gordon uses it to contact Batman in "Heart of Steel" when she believes that an impostor has replaced her father. At this meeting, the signal is partially destroyed when Batman is attacked by a Harvey Bullock duplicate, and Barbara uses Batman's grapple gun to pull the robot into the signal, electrocuting it. Likewise, the real Bullock uses the signal for the first time when reluctantly asking for Batman's help in discovering who is trying to kill him in "A Bullet for Bullock". The first use of a Bat-Signal of any kind in the series was in "Joker's Favor", where a man, forced to do a favor for the Joker at a dinner honoring Commissioner Gordon, uses a large bat model hanging from a crane, swinging it back and forth in front of a window to try to contact Batman.

In the 1993 film Batman: Mask of the Phantasm, Batman is being hunted by the police as a suspect in the recent murder of several gang lords (a crime actually committed by the Phantasm), and Bullock, under orders from Councilman Arthur Reeves, tries to use the Bat-Signal to lure him in. Batman, knowing that it is a trap, does not respond. It is also used at the end of the film to call Batman to action once again (after Batman was cleared of the murder charges).

The Bat-Signal is not used in the 1999 series Batman Beyond, save for one appearance, as Police Commissioner Barbara Gordon both has a direct line to the Batcave and is not as cooperative with the original Batman and his successor as her father was. The one appearance of the signal is in "Ascension", where Paxton Powers, the son of Derek Powers (Blight), has a small replica of it built to summon the new Batman, Terry McGinnis. Terry destroys it upon arrival, advising Paxton to "try e-mail," indicating his personal dislike of the device as being obsolete to his time.

In the 2002 web-series Gotham Girls, Batgirl appears to push her father Commissioner Gordon onto the Bat-Signal, crushing it. It is revealed that he is merely a robotic replacement.

The Batman
In the episode "The Cat, the Bat, and the Ugly" of the animated TV series The Batman, Batman has just foiled a plot that The Penguin tried to pull on top of a lighthouse. After talking to Detective Yin, Batman is standing in front of the lighthouse light when the Bat-Signal appears in the sky. In the second-season finale, "Night in the City" after newly inducted Commissioner Gordon finally agrees to form an alliance with Batman; he begins using the Bat-Signal. After that his "Batwave" alarm was rarely used.

The Lego Batman Movie
In the beginning of The Lego Batman Movie Commissioner Gordon attempted to use the Bat-Signal to alert Batman only for it to be egged by Egghead thus disabling it. Later Batman uses the Bat-Signal to make different versions of the symbol for Robin, Barbara, Alfred and many of Batman's allies summoning them to team up and defeat the Joker.

Batman: Gotham by Gaslight
In Batman: Gotham by Gaslight, when Selina Kyle is being pursued by Jack the Ripper in an empty fair, she uses her blood and a spotlight to create a makeshift Bat-Signal to attract Batman's attention, sketching a bat on the light and aiming it at the sky.

DC Super Hero Girls
In the DC Super Hero Girls animated short "#BatCatcher", Batgirl mistakenly believes she is summoned by the Bat-Signal when in reality the shadow is cast from a real bat inside her bedroom. In the episode "#FromBatToWorse", Batgirl tries to use a Bat-Signal flashlight to call Batman for help against Poison Ivy, but it doesn't work and Poison Ivy points out that unlike Gotham City, there is no pollution in the skies of Metropolis for the Bat-Signal to shine against.

Harley Quinn
In the Harley Quinn episode "You're a Damn Good Cop, Jim Gordon", an overworked and depressed Commissioner Gordon starts excessively using the Bat-Signal to contact Batman for petty things like having someone to talk to about his failing marriage. Batman gets so annoyed that he confiscates the Bat-Signal. By the end of the episode, they make amends and Batman restores it.

Video games
The Bat-Signal is also seen in DC Universe Online (2010), on top of the GCPD 9th station in the East End of Gotham. It is the focus of the feat to see places related to major DC Universe figures.
The Bat-Signal is seen in Batman: Arkham Asylum (2009) in the sky of Gotham City. During Batman's Scarecrow-induced nightmares, Batman must sneak through the remains of Arkham and defeat a gigantic Scarecrow by aiming the Bat-Signal at him. The Bat-Signal is also used in Batman: Arkham City (2011) as a waypoint in the sky that hovers high above the location of the player's objective, and the original signal is located at the now-abandoned GCPD building as the subject of a Riddler Challenge. The usage of the Bat-Signal as a waypoint continues in the prequel Batman: Arkham Origins (2013) and Batman: Arkham Knight (2015), though the signal itself appears in the latter game. In Arkham Knight, the Bat-Signal is seen in the sky of Gotham City at the start of the game as Commissioner Gordon's way of contacting Batman, with the signal itself being the subject of a Riddler Challenge and a way of activating the Knightfall Protocol. After activating Knightfall, the signal blows up in a self-destruct option (added by Lucius Fox) after Batman saves the whole city, with its remains being inspected by Nightwing in a downloadable content.
In Batman: The Telltale Series, Gordon first uses the Bat Signal in Episode 3, as he needed Batman's help when the cops are stretched thin throughout the city.

See also
Bat phone

References

Fictional elements introduced in 1942
Searchlights
Fictional symbols

it:Batman#Batsegnale